Eustalodes is a genus of moth in the family Gelechiidae.

Species
 Eustalodes achrasella Bradley, 1981
 Eustalodes anthivora Clarke, 1954
 Eustalodes oenosema Meyrick, 1927

References

Chelariini